Assimilation or Assimilate may refer to:

Culture
Cultural assimilation, the process whereby a minority group gradually adapts to the customs and attitudes of the prevailing culture and customs
Language shift, also known as language assimilation, the progressive process whereby a speech community of a language shifts to speaking another language
Cultural assimilation of Native Americans in the United States
Jewish assimilation refers to the gradual cultural assimilation and social integration of Jews in their surrounding culture
Assimilation effect, a frequently observed bias in social cognition
Religious assimilation
Assimilation (French colonial), an ideological basis of French colonial policy in the 19th and 20th centuries

Science
Assimilation (biology) the conversion of nutrient into the fluid or solid substance of the body, by the processes of digestion and absorption
Assimilation (phonology), a linguistic process by which a sound becomes similar to an adjacent sound
Data assimilation, updating a numerical model with observed data
Assimilation (psychology), incorporation of new concepts into existing schemes

Media
Assimilation (album), a 2001 album by Deliverance
Assimilation (Star Trek), fictional process used by the Borg race
Assimilate, a 2019 sci-fi horror film
Assimilate: A Critical History of Industrial Music, a 2013 non-fiction book